Anne or Ann Holmes may refer to:

Anne Holmes; see List of As the World Turns characters
Ann Holmes Redding (born 1952), former Episcopal priest, defrocked for converting to Islam
Ann Holmes, lesbian minister; see Lesbian American history